Barghani-ye Bala (also Romanized as Barghanī-ye Bālā; also known as Barghanī) is a village in Tarom Rural District, in the Central District of Hajjiabad County, Hormozgan Province, Iran. At the 2006 census, its population was 330, in 85 families.

References 

Populated places in Hajjiabad County